Henry Mayo Newhall Hospital (commonly referred to as Henry Mayo Hospital) is a 357-bed not-for-profit community hospital and trauma center in Valencia, Santa Clarita, California. It was founded in 1975. Named after businessman Henry Mayo Newhall, the hospital recently opened a new patient tower that includes 90 private patient rooms and a new Center for Women and Newborns, also with all private rooms. 

Henry Mayo is an Advanced Primary Stroke Center and a STEMI Receiving Center. The hospital features inpatient facilities, a neonatal intensive care unit, catheterization lab, infusion center, breast center and an outpatient surgery center. 

Additional services include cardiovascular, trauma, emergency, intensive care, neonatal intensive care, maternity, surgery, nursing, wound care, spine and joint, behavioral health, and acute rehab, as well as cancer, imaging, lab, digestive, respiratory services and physical and occupational therapies.

Fitness center
Henry Mayo Fitness and Health offers personal training, group fitness classes, and basic gym amenities. Henry Mayo Fitness and Health also houses Henry Mayo's outpatient physical therapy clinic and two community education classrooms. Almost all the community education classrooms are free and open to the community.

Diabetes prevention program

The PreventT2 program is designed to help prediabetics make lifestyle changes that will prevent or significantly delay the onset of Type 2 diabetes. The PreventT2 Program is part of the National Diabetes Prevention Program, led by the Centers for Disease Control and Prevention (CDC).

Disaster resource center

Henry Mayo is part of the Los Angeles County Disaster Resource Center (DRC) network, which comprises 13 trauma centers, hospitals, and management base stations located throughout Los Angeles.

Volunteer services
Volunteers provide services in the Gift Shop, Patient Support/Nursing Units, Special Events, Information Desk and Waiting Room Ambassadors, Emergency Department, and Pet Visitation.

Henry Mayo Newhall Hospital Foundation

The Henry Mayo Newhall Hospital Foundation raises funds for the capital needs of Henry Mayo Newhall Hospital. Established in 1984.

Additional services
Services:

Advanced Primary Stroke Center
Acute Rehabilitation Unit
Behavioral Health Unit
Cancer Program
Cardiovascular Services
Diabetes Management Program
Digestive Services
Infusion Center
Joint Replacement and Spine Surgery Programs
Maternity Services
Labor of Love Maternity Classes
Lactation Services
Neonatal Intensive Care Unit
Outpatient Surgery Center
Outpatient Therapy Services
Outpatient Laboratory Services
Respiratory Services
Sheila R. Veloz Breast Center
Spine Program
Trauma Center
Wound Care Services

References

Hospitals in Los Angeles County, California
Santa Clarita, California
Hospital buildings completed in 1975
Hospitals established in 1975
1975 establishments in California
Organizations based in Los Angeles County, California

Trauma centers